Statistics of Liberian Premier League in season 1978.

Overview
Saint Joseph Warriors won the championship.

References

Liberia - List of final tables (RSSSF)

Football competitions in Liberia